The Caesars Superdome, commonly known simply as the Superdome (formerly known as Mercedes-Benz Superdome and Louisiana Superdome), is a multi-purpose stadium located in the Central Business District of New Orleans, Louisiana. It is the home stadium of the New Orleans Saints of the National Football League (NFL).

Plans were drawn up in 1967 by the New Orleans modernist architectural firm of Curtis and Davis and the building opened as the Louisiana Superdome in 1975.

The Superdome has routinely hosted major sporting events; it has hosted seven Super Bowl games (and will host its eighth, Super Bowl LIX, in 2025), and five NCAA championships in men's college basketball. In college football, the Sugar Bowl has been played at the Superdome since 1975, which is one of the "New Year's Six" bowl games of the College Football Playoff (CFP). It also traditionally hosts the Bayou Classic, a rivalry game played between the HBCUs Southern University and Grambling State University. The Superdome was also the long-time home of the Tulane Green Wave football team of Tulane University until 2014 (when they returned on-campus at Yulman Stadium), and was the home venue of the New Orleans Jazz of the National Basketball Association (NBA) from 1975 until 1979.

In 2005, the Superdome housed thousands of people seeking shelter from Hurricane Katrina.  The building suffered extensive damage as a result of the storm, and was closed for many months afterward. The building was fully refurbished and reopened in time for the Saints' 2006 home opener on September 25.

History

Planning
David Dixon (who decades later founded the United States Football League) conceived of the Superdome while attempting to convince the NFL to award a franchise to New Orleans. After hosting several exhibition games at Tulane Stadium during typical New Orleans summer thunderstorms, Dixon was told by NFL Commissioner Pete Rozelle that the NFL would never expand into New Orleans without a domed stadium. Dixon then won the support of the governor of Louisiana, John McKeithen. When they toured the Astrodome in Houston, Texas in 1966, McKeithen was quoted as saying, "I want one of these, only bigger", in reference to the Astrodome itself. Bonds were passed for construction of the Superdome on November 8, 1966, seven days after commissioner Pete Rozelle awarded New Orleans the 25th professional football franchise. 

The stadium was conceptualized to be a multifunctional stadium for football, baseball and basketball—with moveable field level stands that would be arranged specifically for each sport and areas with dirt (for the bases and pitchers mound) covered with metal plates on the stadium floor (they were covered by the artificial turf during football games)—and there are also meeting rooms that could be rented for many different purposes. Dixon imagined the possibilities of staging simultaneous high school football games side by side and suggested that the synthetic surface be white. Blount International of Montgomery, Alabama was chosen to build the stadium.

As the dome was being constructed, various individuals developed eccentric models of the structure: one was of sugar, another consisted of pennies. The so-called "penny model" traveled to the Philadelphia Bicentennial '76 exhibition. New Orleanian Norman J. Kientz built the model with 2,697 pennies and donated it to the Superdome Board of Commissioners in April 1974.

It was hoped the stadium would be ready in time for the 1972 NFL season, and the final cost of the facility would come in at $46 million. Instead, due to political delays, construction did not start until August 11, 1971, and was not finished until August 1975, seven months after Super Bowl IX was scheduled to be played in the stadium. Since the stadium was not finished in time for the Super Bowl, the game had to be moved to Tulane Stadium, and was played in cold and rainy conditions. Factoring in inflation, construction delays, and the increase in transportation costs caused by the 1973 oil crisis, the final price tag of the stadium skyrocketed to $165 million. Along with the state police, Elward Thomas Brady, Jr., a state representative from Terrebonne Parish and a New Orleans native, conducted an investigation into possible financial irregularities, but the Superdome went forward despite the obstacles.

Early history (1975–2004)
The New Orleans Saints opened the 1975 NFL season at the Superdome, losing 21–0 to the Cincinnati Bengals in the first regular-season game in the facility. Tulane Stadium, the original home of the Saints, was condemned for destruction on the day the Superdome opened.

The first Super Bowl played in the stadium was Super Bowl XII in January 1978, the first in prime time.

The original artificial turf playing surface in the Superdome was produced and developed by Monsanto (which made the first artificial playing surface for sports, AstroTurf) specifically for the Superdome, and was named "Mardi Grass".

The Superdome replaced the first generation "Mardi Grass" surface to the next-generation FieldTurf surface midway through the 2003 football season on November 16.

Shelter of last resort during Hurricane Katrina 

The Superdome was used as a "shelter of last resort" for those in New Orleans unable to evacuate from Hurricane Katrina when it struck on August 29, 2005. During the storm, a large section of the outer covering was peeled off by high winds. The photos of the damage, in which the concrete underneath was exposed, quickly became an iconic image of Hurricane Katrina. A few days later, the dome was closed until September 25, 2006.

By August 31, there had been three deaths in the Superdome: two elderly medical patients and a man who is believed to have committed suicide by jumping from the upper-level seats. There were also unconfirmed reports of rape, vandalism, violent assaults, crack dealing/drug abuse, and gang activity inside the Superdome. After a National Guardsman was attacked and shot in the dark by an assailant, the National Guard inside the Superdome used barbed wire barricades to separate themselves from the other people in the dome. On September 11, New Orleans Police Superintendent Eddie Compass reported there were "no confirmed reports of any type of sexual assault."

United States Navy sniper Chris Kyle claimed that during the hurricane, he and another sniper climbed to the top of the dome and killed 30 armed looters during the chaos following the event. This claim has never been independently verified, and there is no evidence of dozens of people being slain by a sniper or gunman, with commentary noting that it would be unlikely that 30 people would have been killed without anyone noticing it or reporting it to the media or the police. Kyle's story had been reported in a number of publications, including the New Yorker, with Kyle relating the story to other military personnel.

The Superdome cost $185 million to repair and refurbish. To repair the Superdome, FEMA put up $115 million, the state spent $13 million, the Louisiana Stadium & Exposition District refinanced a bond package to secure $41 million and the NFL contributed $15 million.

After being damaged from the flooding disaster, a new Sportexe MomentumTurf surface was installed for the 2006 season.

On Super Bowl XL on February 5, 2006, the NFL announced that the Saints would play their home opener on September 24, 2006 in the Superdome against the Atlanta Falcons. The game was later moved to September 25.

The reopening of the dome was celebrated with festivities including a free outdoor concert by the Goo Goo Dolls before fans were allowed in, a pre-game performance by U2 and Green Day performing a cover of the Skids' "The Saints Are Coming", and a coin toss conducted by then-President George W. Bush. In front of ESPN's largest-ever audience at that time, the Saints won the game 23–3 with 70,003 in attendance, and went on to a successful season, reaching their first ever NFC Championship Game.

2008–present

Further renovations

In 2008, new windows were installed to bring natural light into the building. Later that year, the roof-facing of the Superdome was also remodeled, restoring the roof with a solid white hue. An innovative barrier system for drainage was also added, allowing the dome to resemble its original facade.

In addition, escalators were added to the outside of the club rooms. Each suite includes modernized rooms with raised ceilings, leather sofas, and flat-screen TVs, as well as glass brushed aluminum and wood-grain furnishings. A new $600,000 point-of-sale system was also installed, allowing fans to purchase concessions with credit cards throughout the stadium for the first time.

During the summer of 2010, the Superdome installed  of the UBU Speed S5-M synthetic turf system, an Act Global brand. In 2017 Act Global installed a new turf in time for the NFL Season.  For the 2018, 2019 and 2020 NFL seasons Turf Nation Inc located in Dalton, GA have supplied the synthetic turf system for the Superdome, The Superdome has, as of 2017, the largest continuous synthetic turf system in the NFL.

Beginning in 2011, demolition and new construction began to the lower bowl of the stadium, reconfiguring it to increase seating by 3,500, widening the plaza concourse, building two bunker club lounges and adding additional concession stands. Crews tore down the temporary stairs that led from Champions Square to the Dome, and replaced them with permanent steps. Installation of express elevators that take coaches and media from the ground level of the stadium to the press box were also completed. New  bunker lounges on each side of the stadium were built. The lounges are equipped with flat-screen TVs, granite counter tops and full-service bars. These state-of-the-art lounges can serve 4,500 fans, whose old plaza seats were upgraded to premium tickets, giving those fans leather chairs with cup-holders. The plaza level was extended, closing in space between the concourse and plaza seating, adding new restrooms and concession areas. The renovations also ended the stadium's ability to convert to a baseball configuration. The renovations were completed in late June 2011 in time for the Essence Music Festival.

Naming rights 
Naming rights to the Superdome were sold for the first time in 2011 to automaker Mercedes-Benz, renaming the facility Mercedes-Benz Superdome. Mercedes-Benz did not renew the contract, and in July 2021 it was announced that the naming rights would  be sold to Caesars Entertainment, under which it was renamed Caesars Superdome.

Statue 
On July 27, 2012, a statue was unveiled at a plaza next to the Superdome. The work, titled Rebirth, depicts one of the most famous plays in Saints history—Steve Gleason's block of a Michael Koenen punt that the Saints recovered for a touchdown early in the first quarter of the team's first post-Katrina game in the Superdome.

Super Bowl XLVII power failure 
The Superdome hosted the Super Bowl XLVII football game on February 3, 2013. A partial power failure halted game play for about 34 minutes in the third quarter between the Baltimore Ravens and the San Francisco 49ers. It caused CBS, who was broadcasting the game, to lose some of its cameras as well as voiceovers by commentators Jim Nantz and Phil Simms. At no point did the game go off the air, though the game had no audio for about two minutes. While the lights were coming back on, sideline reporter Steve Tasker reported on the outage as a breaking news situation until power was restored enough for play to continue.

On February 8, 2013, it was reported that a relay device intended to prevent an electrical overload had caused the failure.  The device was located in an electrical vault owned and operated by Entergy, the electrical utility for the New Orleans area. That vault is approximately one quarter mile away from the Superdome. A subsequent report from an independent auditor confirmed the relay device as the cause. The Superdome's own power system was never compromised.

End zone scoreboards and new lighting 
Other upgrades included a complete upgrade to the Superdome's interior floodlighting system to an efficient LED system with programmable coloring, light show effects, and instant on-off; in normal mode the stadium will have a more vibrant and naturally pleasing system resembling natural daylight.

Current renovations 
In November 2019, phase one plans were approved by the Louisiana Stadium and Exposition District, commonly known as the Superdome Commission, for a $450 million renovation. The renovation, designed by Trahan Architects (founded by Victor F. "Trey" Trahan III, FAIA), will include atriums that will replace the ramp system, improved concourses, and field-level end zone boxes. The first phase of work began January 2020 and includes installing alternative exits and constructing a large kitchen and food-service area.

2021 roof fire 
On September 21, 2021, thick black smoke was seen rising from the top of the Superdome while renovations and maintenance were underway by workers on the roof. One person was injured in the blaze that initially started when a pressure washer caught fire. Firefighters brought the fire under control within an hour. No structural damage occurred to the building, and future events were not impacted.

Features

Capacity
The Superdome has a listed football seating capacity of 76,468 (expanded) or 73,208 (not expanded) and a maximum basketball seating capacity of 73,432. However, published attendance figures from events such as the Super Bowl football game have exceeded 79,000. The basketball capacity does not reflect the NCAA's new policy on arranging the basketball court on the 50-yard line on the football field, per 2009 NCAA policy. In 2011, 3,500 seats were added, increasing the Superdome's capacity to 76,468. The Superdome's capacity was 78,133 for WrestleMania 34.

The chronology of the capacity for football is as follows:

Notable events

American Football

The Superdome's primary tenant is the NFL's New Orleans Saints. The team regularly draws capacity crowds.

The NFL has hosted seven Super Bowls at the Superdome, most recently Super Bowl XLVII in 2013. The Superdome is scheduled to host Super Bowl LIX in 2025.

The 1976 Pro Bowl was held at the Superdome on Monday, January 26, 1976. It was the NFL's 26th annual all-star game.

The Bowl Championship Series National Championship Games were played at the Superdome four times. The College Football Playoff semifinal game is played every three years in the stadium. The CFP national championship game was played at the stadium once. Two other bowl games are also played there annually: the Sugar Bowl and New Orleans Bowl. The stadium also now hosts the Louisiana Kickoff. Florida State was victorious 24-23 over LSU in the first matchup of the inaugural kickoff.

The Superdome also hosts the Bayou Classic, an annual rivalry classic between the state's two largest historically black colleges and universities, Grambling State and Southern. Tulane University played their home games at the stadium from 1975 to 2013 (except 2005) before moving to on-campus Yulman Stadium.

In 2013, the Arena Football League New Orleans VooDoo played their last six home games of the season at the stadium. From 1991 to 1992, the New Orleans Night of the AFL played at the stadium.

The annual Louisiana Prep Classic state championship football games organized by the Louisiana High School Athletic Association have been held at the Superdome since 1981, except in 2005 following the extreme damage of Hurricane Katrina (moved to Independence Stadium in Shreveport) and 2020 due to the COVID-19 pandemic (moved to Northwestern State University in Natchitoches, Louisiana). The first state championship game in the stadium matched New Orleans Catholic League powers St. Augustine and Jesuit on December 15, 1978. The Purple Knights won their second Class AAAA title in four seasons by ousting the Blue Jays, 13–7, in front of over 42,000 fans.

Home field advantage
Since the Superdome's reopening in the wake of Hurricane Katrina and the increased success of the New Orleans Saints, the Superdome has developed a reputation for having a very strong home field advantage. While all domed stadiums possess this quality to some degree, the Superdome is known to be extremely loud during games, especially during offensive drives by the visiting team.

During a pregame interview before the Minnesota Vikings' opening game of the 2010 NFL season against the Saints, Brett Favre, reflecting on the Vikings' loss to the Saints in the 2009 NFC Championship Game, said of the Superdome: "That was, by far, the most hostile environment I've ever been in.  You couldn't hear anything." It was during that loss that some of the Vikings players elected to wear earplugs, including Favre. It was the first game of the season that they had chosen to do so.

Baseball
The bowl was reconfigured in a renovation from 2006 to 2011, which replaced the moveable seats with a pre-cast concrete deck and moved the seating closer to the field, creating 3,500 new seats in the lower bowl. This made the bowl more suitable for football, but less accommodating for baseball.

The first baseball game in the Superdome was an exhibition between the Minnesota Twins and the Houston Astros on April 6, 1976.

Superdome officials pursued negotiations with Oakland Athletics officials during the 1978–79 baseball off-season about moving the Athletics to the Superdome. The Athletics were unable to break their lease at the Oakland–Alameda County Coliseum and remained in Oakland. Superdome officials met with the Pittsburgh Pirates in April 1981 about moving the club to New Orleans when the Pirates were unhappy with their lease at Three Rivers Stadium.

In the mid-1990s, the Superdome was planned to be the home of the yet-to-be named New Orleans team, a charter franchise of the United League (UL) which was a planned third league of Major League Baseball (MLB).

Minor League Baseball
The American Association New Orleans Pelicans played at the Superdome during the 1977 season. The Pelicans' season attendance was 217,957 at the dome.

Major League Baseball exhibitions
The Minnesota Twins and the Houston Astros played an exhibition game on April 6, 1976. The New York Yankees played exhibition games at the Superdome in 1980, 1981, 1982, and 1983. The Yankees hosted the Baltimore Orioles on March 15 and 16, 1980. 45,152 spectators watched the Yankees beat the Orioles 9–3 on March 15, 1980. The following day, 43,339 fans saw Floyd Rayford lead the Orioles to a 7–1 win over the Yankees. In 1981, the Yankees played the New York Mets, Philadelphia Philles and Pittsburgh Pirates in the dome. In 1982, the Yankees played the Montreal Expos and Texas Rangers and late in 1982, the Yankees considered opening the 1983 regular season at the Superdome if Yankee Stadium would not be ready yet after renovations. The 1983 New York Yankees also played the Montreal Expos and Toronto Blue Jays in the Superdome that year. The Philadelphia Phillies and St. Louis Cardinals closed the 1984 spring training season with two games at the dome on March 31, 1984, and April 1, 1984. In what was a preview of the 1989 World Series, the Oakland A's played the San Francisco Giants in two games on March 28–29, 1989. In 1991, the Los Angeles Dodgers played the Oakland A's in two games on March 22–23, 1991. The A's also played the New York Mets in two contests on March 26–27, 1993. In 1994, the Boston Red Sox played the New York Yankees in two games on April 1–2, 1994. The last professional baseball games played in the Superdome occurred on April 3–4, 1999, when the Chicago Cubs and Minnesota Twins played a two-game series dubbed the "New Orleans Major League Baseball Classic."

Busch Challenge/Winn-Dixie Showdown
The Busch Challenge/Winn-Dixie Showdown was a college baseball tournament held in the Superdome from 1987 to 1999. LSU, Tulane and University of New Orleans played an in-state team and out-of-state teams from Alabama, Arkansas, California, Florida, Georgia, Mississippi, North Carolina, Oklahoma and Texas in the annual tournament. The in-state team was Louisiana-Lafayette. The out-of-state teams were Alabama, Arkansas, Auburn, Cal State Fullerton, Duke, Florida, Florida State, Georgia, Georgia Southern, Georgia Tech, Houston, Lamar, Miami (FL), Mississippi State, NC State, North Carolina, Oklahoma, Oklahoma State, Ole Miss, Oral Roberts, South Alabama, Southern California, Southern Mississippi, Texas A&M, UCLA.

Basketball
The NCAA has hosted the Men's Final Four at the Superdome six times in 1982, 1987, 1993, 2003, 2012, and 2022. The stadium hosted regional semifinals and finals in 1981 and 1990, as well as first- and second-round games in 1999 and 2001.

The NBA's New Orleans Jazz used the Superdome as their home court, from 1975 to 1979.  In 1977, the Jazz set a then-record in attendance for an NBA game, with 35,077 watching the Jazz led by Pete "Pistol Pete" Maravich against the Philadelphia 76ers, led by fellow future Hall of Famer Julius Erving.

Tulane used the Superdome as its primary home court from its opening in 1975 through 1982. It played occasional games there in the 1990s against high-profile opponents before the opening of the New Orleans Arena (now the Smoothie King Center) in 1999.

In 1996, the stadium hosted the AAU Junior Olympics basketball competition.

Boxing
On October 14, 1975, the Dome hosted Muhammad Ali Appreciation Day. The Muhammad Temple of Islam 46 in New Orleans organized the activities, with Ali's appearance as the day's highlight. Speakers included Dr. Na'im Akbar, Wallace D. Muhammad and Louis Farrakhan.

The Superdome hosted the September 15, 1978 fight some called the Ali rematch where Muhammad Ali won the world Heavyweight title for the third time by beating Leon Spinks in front of a crowd of 65,000. It was Ali's last professional win.

Leonard–Durán II, also known as the No Más Fight, took place on November 25, 1980, at the Louisiana Superdome. In the match, Sugar Ray Leonard defeated Roberto Durán to regain the WBC Welterweight Championship. The match gained its famous appellation in the end of the eighth round when Durán turned away from Leonard, towards the referee and quit by saying "No más" (Spanish for "No more").

On December 3, 1982, the Superdome hosted the Carnival of Champions. In the first of two co-main events, Wilfredo Gómez would defend his WBC world Jr Featherweight championship against WBC's world Bantamweight champion Lupe Pintor. In the second, Wilfred Benítez defended his WBC world Jr Middleweight championship against the former WBA Welterweight champion of the world Thomas Hearns.

Gymnastics
The USSR National Gymnastics Team performed for the first time in Louisiana in 1976. The Superdome event featured Olga Korbut, Nelli Kim, Nicolai Andrianov and Alexander Dityatin.

At the 1995 U.S. Gymnastics National Championships, Dominique Moceanu became the youngest Women's All-Around National Champion in U.S. history at 13 years old, a record that still stands.  John Roethlisberger also won his fourth and final U.S. Men's All-Around National Championship.

In 1996, the stadium hosted the AAU Junior Olympics gymnastics competition.

Motocross
The Superdome hosted an AMA Supercross Championship round from 1977 to 1980, 1998 to 2002, 2009 and 2012. On June 4, 1977, 40,000 fans watched Jimmy Weinert win the sixth of 12 races for a $250,000 purse.  of dirt were piled into the center of the Superdome for the event.

Rugby union
The Superdome was scheduled to host a rugby union match on August 1, 2015, between English Premiership team Saracens and New Zealand's Super Rugby team Crusaders. The match was organized by RugbyLaw, organizers of the National Rugby Football League. The match was cancelled, however, as USA Rugby, the governing body of the sport in the United States, refused to approve the artificial turf playing surface.

Soccer
The Superdome's first soccer matches occurred on September 5, 1976. In a doubleheader, two local club teams (Costa Rica and Olympia) squared off, followed by a post-season North American Soccer League matchup between the New York Cosmos and the Dallas Tornado. Pelé and Kyle Rote, Jr. led their respective teams, but it was Werner Roth and Ramon Mifflin who notched goals for New York in the Cosmos' 2–1 victory.

The U.S. women's national team met China in the Superdome on December 16, 2015, in what was both the final match of the USWNT's post-World Cup Victory Tour, as well as Abby Wambach's last game for the national team. China won, 1–0, in front of 32,950 fans: a record-setting attendance for a soccer match in Louisiana. On October 19, 2017, the USWNT played an international friendly against the Korea Republic, defeating them 3–1. Alex Morgan scored in the 40th minute for the United States, tallying her 78th career goal.

International soccer matches

Professional wrestling
The Superdome was renowned for hosting many of Mid-South Wrestling's large, "Blow Off" events that were culminations of weeks or months of feuds and rivalries. Bill Watts was the promoter of this territory and gained much notoriety from promotion of his events in the Superdome.

April 19, 1986, saw Jim Crockett Promotions (in association with Bill Watts' UWF and All Japan Pro Wrestling) host the first of three annual Jim Crockett Sr. Memorial Cup Tag Team Tournaments. 24 teams competed in a single day show with an afternoon 1st rounds and finals in the evening. The tournament final saw The Road Warriors prevail over Magnum T. A. and Ron Garvin. Besides tag team tournament the Superdome attendance of 13,000 saw NWA World Champion Ric Flair retain the title via disqualification from Dusty Rhodes and Mid-South North American Champion Hacksaw Jim Duggan beat Buzz Sawyer.

WCW held its sixth Clash of the Champions on April 2, 1989. The event saw Ricky Steamboat defeat Ric Flair in a two out of three falls match 2–1 to retain the NWA World Heavyweight Championship, arguably one of the greatest matches of all time. Clash VI was held on the same day as WrestleMania V and on free TV in an attempt to hurt the PPV rating.
On January 13, 1997, WCW Monday Nitro was also broadcast from the Superdome.

WWE's flagship pay-per-view WrestleMania has been hosted at the Superdome twice. It first hosted WrestleMania XXX on April 6, 2014, an event which notably featured Brock Lesnar ending The Undertaker's long-standing WrestleMania winning streak. WrestleMania returned to the Superdome in 2018 for WrestleMania 34.

Tennis
The New Orleans Sun Belt Nets were a charter franchise of World TeamTennis (WTT). The Nets played in the Superdome during the 1978 season.

Olympic wrestling
In 1996, the stadium hosted the AAU Junior Olympics wrestling competition. In February 1997, the Dome hosted the Louisiana High School Athletic Association state wrestling championships.

Concerts
Between August 28 and September 14, 1975, the Superdome continued to celebrate its grand opening, with appearances by Bob Hope, Chayl Jhuren,  Telly Savalas, Dorothy Lamour, Karen Valentine, and Raquel Welch. The Allman Brothers, The Marshall Tucker Band, Wet Willie, the Charlie Daniels band, the O'Jays, the Isley Brothers, the Temptations, Donald Byrd and the Blackbyrds, and the Ringling Brothers and Barnum & Bailey Circus also performed.

On September 19, 1975, The Jacksons performed on their Jackson Five World Tour at the venue.

On October 3, 1975, June Carter, Johnny Cash, Merle Haggard, Waylon Jennings and Jessi Colter performed in the Dome. Fans included then Governor Edwin Edwards, wife Elaine, children Anna, Victoria, Steven and David, and Edwards' grandchildren.

The Superdome's 1977 New Year's Eve celebration opened with The Emotions and Deniece Williams, followed by Earth, Wind and Fire.

On May 29, 1977, the First Annual Superdome KOOL Jazz Spectacular featured Aretha Franklin, Al Green, The Spinners and The Mighty Clouds of Joy. Jimmie "J.J." Walker from the TV series Good Times was the guest M.C.

Since 1981, the Krewe of Endymion has hosted its Mardi Gras ball and concert, the Endymion Extravaganza, at the Superdome. It traditionally serves as the culmination of the krewe's parade.

The Superdome hosted Jimmy Buffett in 1976, Willie Nelson in 1977, the Commodores and Fats Domino in 1978, Kenny Rogers in 1979, Hank Williams Jr. 1981, and Lil Wayne in 2018.

Governor Edwin Edwards held his third inaugural ball at the Superdome on March 12, 1984. Headline acts included Doug Kershaw and Susan Anton.

Because of a booking mixup, the Jets performed a full set to an empty Superdome in the summer of 1987.

The annual Essence Music Festival has been held in the Superdome every year since 1995 (with the exception of 2006, when it was held in Houston, Texas due to Hurricane Katrina repairs, and 2020 when it was cancelled due to the COVID-19 pandemic).

Other events
 The Seventh-day Adventist Church held its 54th General Conference session at the Superdome in June and July 1985.
 Pope John Paul II addressed 80,000 children at the stadium in 1987.
 The Republican National Convention was held there in 1988, nominating then-Vice President George H. W. Bush for president and U.S. Senator Dan Quayle of Indiana as vice president.
 In June 1996, The Hunchback of Notre Dame, Disney's 34th animated feature, had a gala world premiere at this stadium, with over 65,000 people attending the event.
 From February 14 to 25, 2000, Wheel of Fortune aired two weeks' worth of shows that were taped in the dome in January 2000.
 In August 2001, the Bassmaster Classic XXXI final weigh-in was held in the stadium.
 In 2020, the Finish Line of CBS's reality competition The Amazing Race 32 was held at the Superdome.

See also
Champions Square
Sports in New Orleans
Smoothie King Center
History of the New Orleans Saints
List of music venues
List of convention centers in the United States
List of soccer stadiums in the United States
National Register of Historic Places listings in Orleans Parish, Louisiana
List of tallest domes

References

External links

Caesars Superdome at StadiumDB.com

Southeastern Architectural Archive, Special Collections Division, Tulane University Libraries
Caesars Superdome Seating Charts

American football venues in New Orleans
Baseball venues in New Orleans
Basketball venues in New Orleans
Boxing venues in New Orleans
Buildings and structures in New Orleans
Convention centers in Louisiana
Superdome
Defunct baseball venues in the United States
Defunct minor league baseball venues
Defunct college baseball venues in the United States
Event venues on the National Register of Historic Places in Louisiana
Former National Basketball Association venues
Gymnastics venues in New Orleans
High school baseball venues in the United States
High school football venues in Louisiana
Indoor soccer venues in Louisiana
Multi-purpose stadiums in the United States
Music venues in Louisiana
National Football League venues
National Register of Historic Places in New Orleans
NCAA bowl game venues
NCAA Division I men's basketball tournament Final Four venues
New Orleans Jazz venues
New Orleans Night
New Orleans Pelicans (baseball) stadiums
New Orleans Saints stadiums
New Orleans VooDoo
Rodeo venues in the United States
Soccer venues in New Orleans
Sports venues on the National Register of Historic Places
Tennis venues in New Orleans
Tulane Green Wave baseball venues
Tulane Green Wave football venues
United States Football League venues
Wrestling venues in New Orleans
Event venues established in 1975
Sports venues completed in 1975
1975 establishments in Louisiana